Ivo Filipe Cerqueira Damas (born 3 June 1977) is a Portuguese retired footballer who played as an attacking midfielder.

Club career
Born in Penafiel, Damas' claim to fame came at the age of 20 when he scored three goals for lowly F.C. Maia in a 4–5 home loss against country giants FC Porto in the Portuguese Cup. He was immediately bought by Sporting CP in January 1998, but his career would never improve from there – he made his debut in the Primeira Liga with F.C. Alverca, and also served a two-year loan at Sporting Clube Lourinhanense, the Lions' feeder club, appearing very rarely for the first team.

From his 2002 release from Sporting onwards, Damas played in almost every level of the Portuguese football league system, for instance representing F.C. Penafiel and A.D. Lousada. For a short period of time, in 2008, he also had an unassuming abroad experience with Cyprus' Olympiakos Nicosia, but returned the following year to his country, joining amateurs A.C. Vila Meã (fourth division).

Currently plays the role of head coach at CCD Sobrosa, a club that militates in the 1st division AF Porto.

References

External links

1977 births
Living people
People from Penafiel
Portuguese footballers
Association football midfielders
Primeira Liga players
Liga Portugal 2 players
Segunda Divisão players
U.S.C. Paredes players
F.C. Maia players
Sporting CP footballers
F.C. Alverca players
A.D. Ovarense players
F.C. Penafiel players
S.C. Dragões Sandinenses players
A.D. Lousada players
Anadia F.C. players
Olympiakos Nicosia players
AC Vila Meã players
Cypriot Second Division players
Portugal youth international footballers
Portugal under-21 international footballers
Portuguese expatriate footballers
Expatriate footballers in Cyprus
Portuguese expatriate sportspeople in Cyprus
Sportspeople from Porto District